Milecastle 21 (Down Hill) was a milecastle of the Roman Hadrian's Wall.  The site was identified by measurement only, as the milecastle's remains have been totally removed.  This is probably due to extensive quarrying at the site, which now lies under pasture (and partly beneath the Military Road).

Construction 
No details of the Milecastle's construction have been identified.

Excavations and investigations
1966 – English Heritage Field Investigation.  It was noted that there were no visible remains, and that the area was greatly disturbed by quarry tracks and spoil.
1989 – English Heritage Field Investigation.  It was again noted that there were no visible remains, and the probable location was restated.

Associated turrets 
Each milecastle on Hadrian's Wall had two associated turret structures.  These turrets were positioned approximately one-third and two-thirds of a Roman mile to the west of the Milecastle, and would probably have been manned by part of the milecastle's garrison.  The turrets associated with Milecastle 21 are known as Turret 21A and Turret 21B.

Turret 21A
Its remains lie under the modern road.

Location on Ordnance Survey 1:25 000 map:

Turret 21B
Turret 21B (Fence Burn) is probably located partly beneath the military road, though the exact location has been speculated due to the presence of a small mound along with dark soil and pottery discovered in 1930.

Location on Ordnance Survey 1:25 000 map:

Monument records

References

Bibliography

External links 

21